Cheilosa is a  monotypic plant genus of the family Euphorbiaceae first described as a genus in 1826. Only one species is recognized: Cheilosa montana, native to Southeast Asia (Peninsular Malaysia, Borneo, Sumatra, Philippines, Java).

formerly included
moved to Trigonostemon 
Cheilosa whiteana Croizat, synonym of Trigonostemon whiteanus (Croizat) Airy Shaw

References 

Monotypic Euphorbiaceae genera
Acalyphoideae
Flora of Malesia